Thakurnagar is a town in the Indian state of West Bengal. It is close to the border with Bangladesh. It is situated on the east side of the Jessore Road. Thakurnagar is famous for "Baruni Mela".

History 
Thakurnagar is named after Pramath Ranjan Thakur, the great-grandson of the founder of the Hindu Matuan movement, Harichand Thakur. Due to the Thakurs' significance to the Matua Mahasangha, the village is considered the "Mecca of Matuas."

Today, Thakurnagar is best known for the nearby Thakur Bari ("House of the Thakurs" in English). Thakurnagar is also known for its large flower market. It hosts a famous Baruni Mela.

Geography

Location
Thakurnagar is located 63.4 km northeast of Kolkata. It is to the east of the Bangladesh border.

There have been reports of the formation of a Thakurnagar municipality in near future. However, as of May 2018, no notification has been issued to that effect.

Area overview
The area shown in the map was a part of Jessore district from 1883. At the time of Partition of Bengal (1947) the Radcliffe Line placed the police station areas of Bangaon and Gaighata of Jessore district in India and the area was made a part of 24 Parganas district. It is a flat plain located in the lower Ganges Delta. In the densely populated area, 16.33% of the population lives in the urban areas and 83.67% lives in the rural areas.

Note: The map alongside presents some of the notable locations in the subdivision. All places marked in the map are linked in the larger full screen map.

Health concern 
The ground water in North 24 Parganas district is affected by arsenic contamination.

Demographics 
In the 2011 Census of India, Thakurnagar was not identified as a separate city. The population is included in that of nearby cities, but it is not differentiated in the census records. In 2014 West Bengal Government Decided.In 2014,Chief Minister Mamata Banerjee announced to make Thakurnagar Municipality.

See also 
 Thakurnagar railway station

References 

Villages in North 24 Parganas district